Ninth Street Park was a baseball park located in Bradenton, Florida, located where LECOM Park stands today. The park was the home field of the Class-D Bradenton Growers of the Florida State League from 1919 to 1922.

In 1923, the St. Louis Cardinals were to travel to Bradenton for spring training. They soon discovered that the second base position, at Ninth Street Park, was  lower than home plate, and the outfield was even  lower than second base. In a joint venture between the Cardinals and the city, the ball field, which would later become McKechnie Field, was constructed with a grandstand and bleachers for $2,000.

References

Bradenton, Florida
Defunct minor league baseball venues